Tennessee Pusher is the third studio album by folk/country/old time band Old Crow Medicine Show. Released on September 23, 2008, the album was produced by Don Was. The album reached #1 on the Billboard Top Bluegrass Albums Chart. The album is the band's first with Gill Landry, who replaced founder member Critter Fuqua. Fuqua provides only backing vocals on the album.

Track listing

Personnel
Old Crow Medicine Show
Kevin Hayes - guitjo, vocals
Morgan Jahnig - upright bass
Gill Landry - slide guitar, resonator guitar, vocals
Ketch Secor - violin, vocals, guitar, harmonica, banjo
Willie Watson - guitar, vocals, harmonica, violin
Critter Fuqua - backing vocals
Additional musicians
Jim Keltner - drums
Benmont Tench - Hammond C-3 organ

Chart performance

External links
Old Crow Medicine Show (official site)

2008 albums
Old Crow Medicine Show albums
Albums produced by Don Was